Dhruv Sehgal (born 19 March 1990) is an Indian actor, writer and director. He is best known for his work in Dice Media's Little Things, where he portrayed Dhruv Vats alongside Mithila Palkar.

Life and career 
Sehgal is from Delhi. After completing his school in London, he studied at Symbiosis Institute of Media and Communication, Pune. Sehgal worked as an associate director and co-editor for the documentaries Baavra Mann (2013) and I Am Offended! (2015). His short film Kunal won the Golden Gateway Dimensions Mumbai Award at the Mumbai Film Festival, 2016 and was selected for the Mumbai International Film Festival. He has written, acted and directed comedy sketches for Filter Copy and conceptualised three of Dice Media's webseries. He took the lead in the series Little Things, opposite Mithila Palkar, beginning in 2016. Sehgal is the creator and head writer of the series.[6]

He married Kannagi Khanna, his college girlfriend.

Recognition
 Best Short Film at MAMI-2016 for Kunal.

References

External links
 

20th-century births
Living people
Indian television writers
Indian male television actors
Indian Hindus
21st-century Indian male actors
Year of birth missing (living people)